Michalis Kosidis (born 9 February 2002) is a Greek professional footballer who plays as a forward for Super League club AEK Athens.

Personal life 

He hails from Triada, Serres.

References

2002 births
Living people
Greek footballers
Super League Greece players
AEK Athens F.C. players
Association football forwards
Footballers from Thessaloniki
AEK Athens F.C. B players
Greece under-21 international footballers
21st-century Greek people